The 1942 Texas gubernatorial election was held on November 3, 1942.

Incumbent Democratic Governor Coke R. Stevenson defeated Republican nominee Caswell K. McDowell with 96.83% of the vote.

Nominations

Democratic primary
The Democratic primary election was held on July 25, 1942. By winning over 50% of the vote, Stevenson avoided a run-off which would have been held on August 22, 1942.

Candidates

Hal H. Collins, businessman
Alex M. Ferguson, seed breeder
Gene S. Porter, insurance broker
Charles L. Somerville, law school operator
Hope Wheeler, newspaper editor
Coke R. Stevenson, incumbent Governor

Results

Republican nomination

The Republican state convention was held at San Angelo on August 10 and 11, 1942.

Caswell K. McDowell, judge was nominated for Governor.

General election

Candidates
Coke R. Stevenson, Democratic
Caswell K. McDowell, Republican

Results

References

Bibliography
 
 

1942
Texas
Gubernatorial
November 1942 events